The Platinum Collection is a box set by American recording artist Alicia Keys. It contained Keys' first three studio albums, Songs in A Minor (2001), The Diary of Alicia Keys (2003) and As I Am (2007). The box set was released on May 10, 2010, in United States through J Records. It peaked at number twenty on UK Albums Chart, also peaking on charts in Ireland, Portugal, Spain and Switzerland. It was certified Silver by British Phonographic Industry (BPI) for selling over 60,000 copies in United Kingdom.

Commercial performance 
The Platinum Collection was first released on May 4, 2010, in Europe through Sony Music. It only peaked on charts in European countries: in United Kingdom, Ireland, Spain, Portugal and Switzerland. It was also certified Silver by British Phonographic Industry (BPI) for selling over 60,000 copies in United Kingdom. It was released in United States on May 10, 2010, through J Records and failed to chart in that territory.

Content 
Songs in A Minor (2001)
The Diary of Alicia Keys (2003)
As I Am (2007)

Track listing 

Notes
 Lellow is Keys' alias used on track "So Simple".

Charts

Sales and certifications

Release history

References

External links 
Official website 

2010 compilation albums
Alicia Keys compilation albums
J Records compilation albums